Desperate Mission is a 1965 Italian-Spanish-French Eurospy film directed by Roberto Bianchi Montero and starring Germán Cobos. It had a sequel in 1967, Blueprint for a Massacre.

Cast  
  Germán Cobos as Robert Manning, Agent Z-55 
Yoko Tani as Su Ling
Gianni Rizzo as Barrow
Maria Luisa Rispoli  as Sally 
Milton Reid as To-go
Francisco Sanz as Professor Larsen
Giovanni Cianfriglia as Barrow's Henchman 
 Leontine May  as Tania
José Calvo   as The Director of the company

References

External links

1960s spy thriller films
1965 films
Italian spy thriller films
Spanish spy thriller films
French spy thriller films
Films directed by Roberto Bianchi Montero
Films scored by Francesco De Masi
Films with screenplays by Roberto Bianchi Montero
1960s Italian films
1960s Spanish films
1960s French films